Helene Weigel (12 May 19006 May 1971) was a German actress and artistic director. She was the second wife of Bertolt Brecht and was married to him from 1930 until his death in 1956. Together they had two children.

Personal life
Weigel was born in Vienna, Austria-Hungary, the daughter of Leopoldine (née Pollak) and Siegfried Weigel, an accountant-general in a textile factory. Her family was Jewish. She and husband Brecht had two children, Stefan Brecht and Barbara Brecht-Schall. Weigel was a Communist Party member from 1930.

Career
Weigel became the artistic director of the Berliner Ensemble on 16 February 1949. She is best remembered for creating several Brecht roles, including: Pelagea Vlassova, The Mother of 1932; Antigone in Brecht's version of the Greek tragedy; the title role in his civil war play, Señora Carrar's Rifles; and the iconic Mother Courage.

Between 1933 and 1947, as a refugee from Adolf Hitler's Germany, she was seldom able to pursue her acting craft, even during the family's six-year period in Los Angeles. It was only with the foundation of the Berliner Ensemble in East Germany in 1949 that Brecht's theatre began to be recognized worldwide. She died in 1971, still at the helm of the company, and many of the roles that she created with Brecht are still in the theatre's repertoire today.

Death
Weigel died in East Berlin on 6 May 1971, six days before her 71st birthday.

Notable understudies
 Ingrid Pitt, British-Polish actress

References

External links

Berliner Ensemble
Jennifer Marston Willia, Biography of  Helene Weigel, Jewish Women Encyclopedia

1900 births
1971 deaths
Actresses from Vienna
Austrian Jews
Austrian emigrants to Germany
Communist Party of Germany politicians
Jewish socialists
Socialist Unity Party of Germany politicians
Members of the Provisional Volkskammer
Cultural Association of the GDR members
East German women in politics
20th-century German actresses
Jewish emigrants from Nazi Germany to the United States
Recipients of the National Prize of East Germany
Recipients of the Patriotic Order of Merit in gold
Family of Bertolt Brecht